State elections were held in South Australia on 12 July 1975. All 47 seats in the South Australian House of Assembly were up for election. The incumbent Australian Labor Party led by Premier of South Australia Don Dunstan won a third term in government, defeating the Liberal Party of Australia led by Leader of the Opposition Bruce Eastick.

Background
The drop in major party primary votes was due to the socially progressive Liberal Movement (LM) led by Robin Millhouse who achieved 18.3 percent of the primary vote and 2 seats. The party was a breakaway faction of the Liberal and Country League (LCL) which disbanded in 1973, the party which was the predecessor to the South Australian Division of the Liberal Party of Australia. Stemming from discontent within the ranks of the LCL, it was first formed by former Premier Steele Hall as an internal group in 1972 in response to a lack of social and acceptance of electoral reform within the LCL. A year later, when tensions heightened between the LCL's conservative wing and the LM, it was established on its own as a progressive liberal party. When still part of the league, it had eleven representatives; on its own, it initially had three.

The election was fought with the Liberal Party, the Liberal Movement, and the Country Party all competing for votes against Labor, in the background of the Labor Prime Minister Gough Whitlam scandals, with this election taking place six months before the Governor General dismissed the Whitlam government resulting in his defeat at the December 1975 federal election.

Summary of results

The Liberals received a 50.8 percent two-party vote to Labor on 49.2 percent. The Liberals, Liberal Movement, and Country Party held a combined 23 seats, as did Labor. The balance of power was held by independent MP Ted Connelly, the Mayor of Port Pirie. Connelly sided with Dunstan and accepted his offer of Speaker of the South Australian House of Assembly.

The LM won two seats (both sitting members: Robin Millhouse and David Boundy). When the LM joined the Liberal Party in 1976, Boundy joined the Liberals while Millhouse created the New LM; after which the numbers were Labor 23, Liberal 21, Country Party 1, New LM 1, and 1 independent supporting Labor (Connelly).

The 1975 election saw permanent large two-party swings away from Labor in a few rural seats − 13.5 percent in Chaffey, 15.5 percent in Mount Gambier and 16.4 percent in Millicent.

It was the first time that a Labor government in South Australia had been re-elected for a third term, and would be the first seven-year-incumbent Labor government.

The election was also the first in South Australia where both major parties contested all lower house seats.

Upper house reforms
Historically, the Legislative Council (the upper house) had been dominated by an LCL majority for decades due to the Playmander electoral malapportionment as well as the limit on upper house voting rights to the wealthier classes with suffrage dependent on certain property and wage requirements. However they were highly independent and often obstructive to both major parties. Originally the Legislative Council had fixed staggered terms and elections were held separately from lower house elections, which would later be changed by the introduction of joint elections in the 1980s.

The 1975 election saw the introduction of universal suffrage for the Legislative Council and the introduction of a statewide single electorate. It also increased the number elected at each election from 10 to 11, meaning the house increased from 20 to 21 members, and would become a 22-member house from 1979 onwards.

Labor won 6 seats, the Liberal Party won 3, and the Liberal Movement won 2; giving total numbers of Labor 10, Liberal 9, and Liberal Movement 2; giving the Liberal Movement the balance of power. The Liberal Movement members rejoined the Liberal Party in 1976, giving the Liberals a majority in the upper house.

Aftermath

Following the close result of the election where Labor formed minority government, initial one vote one value electoral reform was enacted by Dunstan which would later be amended by future Labor premier John Bannon, after winning the 1989 election on 48.1 percent of the two-party vote. However, these winning minorities were closer than those of the Playmander period and did not occur as a result of malapportionment or weighting. Indeed, some metropolitan seats saw more than three times the number of voters than in some rural seats, something that would be rectified by the one vote one value electoral reform. It became the first and only state from 1989 to legislate the Electoral Commission of South Australia should redraw boundaries after each election with the objective that the party which receives over 50 percent of the statewide two-party vote at the forthcoming election should win the two-party vote in a majority of seats. One element of the Playmander still exists to this day − the change from multi-member to single-member seats.

Key dates
 Issue of writ: 24 June 1975
 Close of nominations: 2 July 1975
 Polling day: 12 July 1975
 Return of writ: On or before 12 August 1975

Results

House of Assembly

|}

Legislative Council

|}

Post-election pendulum

See also
Results of the South Australian state election, 1975 (House of Assembly)
Results of the 1975 South Australian state election (Legislative Council)
Members of the South Australian House of Assembly, 1975-1977
Members of the South Australian Legislative Council, 1975-1979

References
History of South Australian elections 1857-2006, volume 1: ECSA
Historical lower house results
Historical upper house results
State and federal election results  in Australia since 1890

Specific

Elections in South Australia
1975 elections in Australia
1970s in South Australia
July 1975 events in Australia